The 16th Alberta Legislative Assembly was in session from February 15, 1968, to April 27, 1971, with the membership of the assembly determined by the results of the 1967 Alberta general election held on May 23, 1967. The Legislature officially resumed on February 15, 1968, and continued until the fourth session was prorogued on April 27, 1971, and dissolved on July 22, 1971, prior to the 1971 Alberta general election.

Alberta's sixteenth government was controlled by the majority Social Credit Party for the ninth time, led by Premier Ernest Manning, Alberta's longest serving Premier who would retire part way through the session, and be replaced by Harry Strom. The Official Opposition was led by Peter Lougheed of the Progressive Conservative Association of Alberta, who would go on to win the 1971 election and become the 9th Premier of Alberta.  The Speaker was Arthur J. Dixon.

Party standings after the 16th General Election

Standings changes in the 16th Assembly

Members elected
For complete electoral history, see individual districts.

References

Further reading

External links
Alberta Legislative Assembly
Legislative Assembly of Alberta Members Book
By-elections 1905 to present

16